Laevistrombus is a genus of sea snails, marine gastropod mollusks in the family Strombidae, the true conchs.

History 
The taxon Laevistrombus was introduced in the literature as a subgenus of Strombus by Tetsuaki Kira (1955) in the third printing of the 1st edition of Coloured Illustrations of the Shells of Japan. It comprised two species, Strombus (Laevistrombus) canarium and Strombus (L.) isabella Lamarck, 1822. No type specimen was designated, and Kira gave no formal description or statement of differentiation, as required by the ICZN code to validate the name. In a later version of the book, Laevistrombus was elevated to genus level, but a description was still lacking. Rüdiger Bieler and Richard Petit (1996) considered it a nomen nudum, and the authorship was transferred to Robert Tucker Abbott (1960), who had provided a proper description and illustrations of Laevistrombus and specified a type species, Strombus canarium L., in the first volume of his monograph Indo-Pacific Mollusca.  The currently accepted classification was proposed by Sepkoski (2002), who elevated Laevistrombus to genus level based on palaeontological data.

Species
Living species within the genus Laevistrombus include:
Laevistrombus canarium (Linnaeus, 1758)
 Laevistrombus guidoi (Man in 't Veld & De Turck, 1998)
 Laevistrombus liveranii Dekkers, Rymer & S. J. Maxwell, 2021
 Laevistrombus maxwelli Gra-tes, 2022
 Laevistrombus taeniatus (Quoy & Gaimard, 1834)
Laevistrombus turturella (Röding, 1798)
 Laevistrombus vanikorensis (Quoy & Gaimard, 1834)

References

 Quoy, H. E. Th. & Gaimard, P., 1834 Mollusques. Zoologie. In Voyage de découvertes de l'Astrolabe, exécuté par ordre du Roi, pendant les années 1826-1827-1828-1829, sous le commandement de M. J. Dumont d'Urville, vol. 3(1), p. 1-366
 Liverani V. (2014) The superfamily Stromboidea. Addenda and corrigenda. In: G.T. Poppe, K. Groh & C. Renker (eds), A conchological iconography. pp. 1-54, pls 131–164. Harxheim: Conchbooks
Laevistrombus Abbott 1960 (Gastropoda: Strombidae): Indian and southwest Pacific species. Zootaxa 4555(4): 591-506

External links
 
 Abbott, R. T. (1960). The genus Strombus in the Indo-Pacific. Indo-pacific Mollusca. 1 (2): 33-146
 Maxwell S.J., Dekkers A.M., Rymer T.L. & Congdon B.C. (2019). Laevistrombus Abbott 1960 (Gastropoda: Strombidae): Indian and southwest Pacific species. Zootaxa. 4555(4): 491-506.

Strombidae
Cenozoic first appearances
Taxa named by Robert Tucker Abbott